Dawro (or Dawuro) is a zone in the South West Region of Ethiopia. It is located at about 500km southwest of Addis Ababa, the capital of Ethiopia and 319 km of Hawassa, the capital of the SNNPR. Dawuro is bordered on the south by Gamo Gofa Zone, on the west by the Konta special woreda, on the north by the Gojeb River which defines its boundary with the Oromia Region,Jimma zone, on the northeast by Hadiya and Kembata Tembaro Zones, and on the east by Wolayita Zone; the Omo River defines its eastern and southern boundaries. The administrative center of Dawuro was Waka before it was transferred to Tarcha. 

Dawuro has 111 kilometers of all-weather roads and 123 kilometers of dry-weather roads, for an average road density of 53 kilometers per 1000 square kilometers. High points in this Zone include Mount Holla (3720 meters).

Dawuro used to be part of the North Omo Zone, and the 1994 national census counted its inhabitants as part of that Zone. However friction between the various ethnic groups in Semien Omo, which was often blamed on the Welayta people for "ethnic chauvinism" and despite the efforts of the ruling party to emphasize the need to coordinate, consolidate, and unify the smaller ethnic units to achieve the "efficient use of scarce government resources", led to the division of the zone in 2000, resulting with the creation of the Dawuro, Gamo Gofa, and Wolayita Zones, and two special districts.

Demographics 
Based on the 2007 Census conducted by the Central Statistical Agency of Ethiopia (CSA), this zone has a total population of 489,577, of whom 249,263 are men and 240,314 women; with an area of 4,814.52 square kilometers, Dawuro has a population density of 101.69. While 35,044 or 7.16% are urban inhabitants, a further 14 individuals are pastoralists. A total of 89,915 households were counted in this Zone, which results in an average of 5.44 persons to a household, and 86,642 housing units. The two largest ethnic groups reported in this zone included the Dawro (97.32%), and the Hadiya (1.3%); all other ethnic groups made up 1.38% of the population. Dawurtsho is spoken as a first language by 97.44% of the inhabitants, and 1.3% speak Hadiya; the remaining 1.26% spoke all other primary languages reported. 57.71% of the population said they were Protestants, 31.86% practiced Ethiopian Orthodox Christianity, 4.9% observed traditional religions, and 4.61% embraced Catholicism.

Dawro is one of the ethnic groups in Ethiopia that uses its own character set of the Ethiopic syllabary.

Woredas 

Woredas and town administration districts in the Dawro Zone include:
 Gena Bosa
 Isara
 Loma
 Mareka
 Tocha

Former woredas include:
 Isara Tocha
 Loma Bosa
 Mareka Gena

References 

Zones of Ethiopia
South West Ethiopia Peoples' Region